Santiago González and Mate Pavić were the defending champions but only González chose to defend his title, partnering Artem Sitak. González lost in the first round to Marcelo Arévalo and Fabrício Neis.

Leander Paes and Adil Shamasdin won the title after defeating Luca Margaroli and Caio Zampieri 6–1, 6–4 in the final.

Seeds

Draw

References
 Main Draw

Torneo Internacional Challenger León - Doubles
2017 Doubles